Anolis serranoi, Serrano's anole, is a species of lizard in the family Dactyloidae. The species is endemic to Central America.

Etymology
The specific name, serranoi, is in honor of Dr. Francisco Serrano, a biologist and conservationist in El Salvador.

Geographic range
A. serranoi inhabits areas at up to  altitude along the Pacific shores of Central America from Chiapas, Mexico, through Guatemala, to El Salvador.

Description
A. serranoi has long hind limbs, a divided prenasal scale, and a red dewlap in adult males.

Reproduction
A. serranoi is oviparous.

References

Further reading
Johnson JD, Mata-Silva V, García-Padilla E, Wilson LD (2015). "The Herpetofauna of Chiapas, Mexico: composition, distribution, and conservation". Mesoamerican Herpetology 2 (3): 272–329.
Köhler G (1999). "Eine neue Saumfingerart der Gattung Norops von der Pazifikseite des nördlichen Mittelamerika ". Salamandra 35 (1): 37–52. (Norops serranoi, new species). (in German, with abstracts in English and Spanish).

Anoles
Reptiles described in 1999
Taxa named by Gunther Köhler